Cinnamon Hotels & Resorts is a major Sri Lankan luxury hotel chain brand. Cinnamon Hotels was recognised as the most valuable hospitality brand in Sri Lanka for 2019 with a brand equity of seven billion Sri Lankan Rupees. Philip Kotler, the renowned marketing author included a 10-page reference of the brand in his 2010 co-authored book, Asian Competitors: Marketing For Competitiveness In The Age Of Digital Consumers on the effective use of social media and various digital initiatives.

History
John Keells Hotels was launched in 1979 as Keells Hotels Limited and in 2004, was listed in Colombo Stock Exchange as John Keells Hotels PLC. The brand Cinnamon Hotels & Resorts launched in London in 2005 and all hotels were brought under the brand name in 2014. In 2019, Cinnamon Bentota Beach was refurbished and the fourth resort in the Maldives, Cinnamon Velifushi Maldives established.

2019 Easter bombings

On 21 April 2019, Easter Sunday, The Cinnamon Grand was targeted by the suicide bombers along with the Shangri-La Colombo and The Kingsbury hotels. Around 9:10 am the perpetrator went to the breakfast buffet at the Taprobane restaurant and set off the bomb in his backpack, killing twenty people. Four staff members at the Taprobane restaurant died in the suicide bombing and three foreign guests, (British, Dutch and American nationals) were also killed. BBC reported another eleven years old guest was also killed.

Operations
John Keells Hotels manages a portfolio of holdings that consists of hotel businesses, which collectively form the John Keells Hotels Group. Asian Hotels and Properties PLC, a sister company of John Keells Hotels, operates Cinnamon Grand Hotel and Crescat Boulevard shopping mall and high-end apartments while Trans-Asia Hotels PLC, a subsidiary of Asian Hotels and Properties, manages Cinnamon Lakeside. Cinnamon Hotels & Resorts offered a thousand complimentary offers for the healthcare workers as gratitude for their work during the COVID-19 pandemic.

Properties

The brand manages 15 four-star and five-star hotels across Sri Lanka and the Maldives. These hotels collectively exceed the room capacity of over 1,400. BOI signed an agreement worth US$29.3 with Indra Hotels and Resorts Kandy, a joint venture by Indra Traders and John Keells Hotels to build a 160-room hotel in Kandy. The project is expected to be completed by 2022 and will be named Cinnamon Red Kandy.

Sources: Annual Report (2022, pp. 16–17)

See also
 Amaya Resorts & Spas, a rival hotel chain in Sri Lanka

References

External links
 Official website

2005 establishments in Sri Lanka
Luxury brands
Sri Lankan brands
Hotel chains in Sri Lanka